A total lunar eclipse took place on Saturday, September 26, 1931. The Moon passed through the central of the Earth's shadow. This was the last central lunar eclipse of Saros cycle 126.

Visibility

Related lunar eclipses

Saros series

Half-Saros cycle
A lunar eclipse will be preceded and followed by solar eclipses by 9 years and 5.5 days (a half saros). This lunar eclipse is related to two total solar eclipses of Solar Saros 133.

See also 
List of lunar eclipses and List of 21st-century lunar eclipses

References

External links 
 Saros series 126
 

1931-09
1931 in science
Central total lunar eclipses